Sanne Kurz; also Susanne Kurz (born 1 October 1974, in Ludwigshafen) is a German cinematographer.

Life
In 1995 Kurz studied documentary film and cinematography at the University of Television and Film Munich, and in 1999–2000 camera/light at the Netherlands Film and Television Academy.

She has worked as a cinematographer for independent film, cinema documentary and commercials, and has collaborated with directors such as Satu Siegemund, Cheryl Dunye and Volker Goetze.

Filmography
2007: The Line
2008: Coup de Grace
2009: The Band
2010: nicht weit von mir
2010: Mommy Is Coming

Awards
2004: Civis media prize Europas Medienpreis für Integration|Young Civis for Himmelfilm – How were skies when you were young?
2009: National Competition for Women DoPs with 1, 2, 3

References

External links

Personal homepage

German women cinematographers
German cinematographers
1974 births
Living people
Film people from Rhineland-Palatinate
People from Ludwigshafen